Hywel ap Edwin (died 1044) was king of Deheubarth in south Wales from 1033 to 1043.

Hywel was the son of Edwin ap Einion and great-grandson of Hywel Dda. When the previous king, Rhydderch ap Iestyn, who had usurped the throne, died in 1033 Hywel became king of Deheubarth, sharing the realm with his brother Maredudd. Hywel and Maredudd's rule did not go unchallenged as the sons of Rhydderch fought in a battle against them in 1034 at Irathwy. Though sources do not name the victors it seems as though Hywel and Maredudd were victorious as they remained in power.  
 
On Maredudd's death in 1035, Hywel became sole king. He came under increasing pressure from Viking raids and from Gruffydd ap Llywelyn who had already seized the throne of Gwynedd. In 1042 Hywel won a victory over a host of Viking marauders near Carmarthen but that year or in 1043 he was driven out of his kingdom by Gruffydd, who also took Hywel's wife (unnamed) as his own. He returned in 1044 with the aid of an Irish fleet to try to regain his kingdom, but Gruffydd defeated them in a battle near the mouth of the River Towy, in which Hywel was killed.

Hywel's nephew, Maredudd ab Owain ab Edwin, succeeded to the throne when Gruffydd died in 1063.

Sources
John Edward Lloyd A history of Wales from the earliest times to the Edwardian conquest (Longmans, Green & Co.)
 Dictionary of Welsh Biography

1044 deaths
Monarchs of Deheubarth
Medieval Welsh killed in battle
11th-century Welsh monarchs
Year of birth unknown
Monarchs killed in action